The following are the national records in athletics in Cyprus maintained by its national athletics federation: The Amateur Athletic Association of Cyprus (ΚΟΕΑΣ).

Outdoor

Key to tables:

h = hand timing

# = not recognised by World Athletics

Men

Women

Indoor

Men

Women

Notes

References
General
Cypriot Outdoor Records – Men 13 May 2021 updated
Cypriot Outdoor Records – Women 13 May 2021 updated
Cypriot Indoor Records – Men  24 February 2021 updated
Cypriot Indoor Records – Women  24 February 2021 updated
Specific

External links
 KOEAS web site

Cyprus
Records
Athletics